David's Album is the tenth studio album by Joan Baez, recorded in Nashville and released in 1969. It peaked at number 36 on the Billboard Pop Albums chart.

History
Baez's then husband, David Harris, a country music fan, was about to be imprisoned for draft resistance, and she recorded the album as a gift to him. It was recorded during the same sessions as Baez's previous release of Bob Dylan songs, Any Day Now.

The cover sketch is a drawing of David Harris by Joan Baez.

The Vanguard reissue contains two previously unreleased tracks, "How Can I Miss You", a duet with Baez' sister Mimi Fariña, and Tom Paxton's "The Last Thing on My Mind."

Reception 

In his Allmusic review, music critic Bruce Eder wrote of the album "the singing and playing still hold up. Baez also sets aside some of her occasional stridency here, in favor of a more relaxed performance that shows her in the most engaging manner of her career... David's Album has transcended its origins in part because of the sheer range of material on it... David Harris is long since out of jail, and he and Baez parted, but it's still an excellent album."

Track listing
"If I Knew" (Nina Dusheck, Pauline Marden)
"Rock Salt and Nails" (Bruce Utah Phillips)
"Glad Bluebird of Happiness" (Darryl Skrabak)
"Green, Green Grass of Home" (Curly Putman)
"Will the Circle be Unbroken" (Charles H. Gabriel, Ada R. Habershon)
"The Tramp on the Street" (Traditional)
"Poor Wayfaring Stranger" (Traditional)
"Just a Closer Walk With Thee" (Traditional)
"Hickory Wind" (Gram Parsons, Bob Buchanan)
"My Home's Across the Blue Ridge Mountains" (A.P. Carter, Tom Ashley)
"How Can I Miss You" (bonus track) (Dan Hicks)
"The Last Thing on My Mind" (bonus track) (Tom Paxton)

Personnel
Joan Baez – vocals, guitar
Fred Carter Jr. – mandolin
Pete Drake – pedal steel guitar
Johnny Gimble – fiddle
Roy Huskey, Jr. – bass
Tommy Jackson – fiddle
Jerry Kennedy – guitar
Jerry Reed – guitar
Harold Bradley – guitar, dobro
Hargus "Pig" Robbins – piano
Harold Rugg – guitar, dobro
Grady Martin – guitar
Buddy Spicher – fiddle
Norbert Putnam – bass
Kenny Buttrey – drums

Chart positions

References

1969 albums
Joan Baez albums
Albums produced by Maynard Solomon
Vanguard Records albums